Mikhail Ivanovich Rostovtzeff, or Rostovtsev (– October 20, 1952), was a Russian historian whose career straddled the 19th and 20th centuries and who produced important works on ancient Roman and Greek history. He was a member of the Russian Academy of Science.

Career
Rostovtzeff was the son of a Latin teacher. In 1918, following the Russian Revolution, he emigrated first to Sweden, then to England, and finally in 1920 to the United States. There he accepted a chair at the University of Wisconsin–Madison before moving to Yale University in 1925 where he taught until his retirement in 1944. He oversaw all archaeological activities of the latter institution in general and the excavations of Dura-Europos in particular. He is believed to have coined the term "caravan city".

While working in Russia, Rostovtzeff became an authority on the ancient history of South Russia and Ukraine. He summed up his knowledge on the subject in Iranians and Greeks in South Russia (1922) and Skythien und der Bosporus (1925). His most important archaeological findings at Yale were described in Dura-Europos and Its Art (1938).

Glen Bowersock described Rostovtzeff's views as having been largely formed by the age of thirty, developing mainly only in the quality of execution in later life, and making him "the last of the nineteenth-century ancient historians". Rostovtzeff was known as a proud and slightly overpowering man who did not fit in easily. In later life, he suffered from depression.

The Social and Economic History of the Roman Empire 

Rostovtzeff was notable for his theories, notably, of the cause of the collapse of the Roman Empire, which he expounded in detail in his magisterial The Social and Economic History of the Roman Empire (1926). Scarred by his experience of fleeing from the Russian Revolution, he attributed the collapse of the Roman Empire to an alliance between the rural proletariat and the military in the third century A.D. Despite not being a Marxist himself, Rostovtzeff used terms such as proletariat, bourgeoisie and capitalism freely in his work and the importation of those terms into a description of the ancient world, where they did not necessarily apply, caused criticism.

Rostovtzeff's theory was quickly understood as one based on the author's own experiences and equally quickly rejected by the academic community. Bowersock later described the book as "the marriage of pre-1918 scholarly training and taste with post-1918 personal experience and reflection." At the same time, however, the detailed scholarship involved in the production of the work impressed his contemporaries and he was one of the first to merge archaeological evidence with literary sources.

Selected publications

Articles

Books
The Birth of the Roman Empire. 1918.
Iranians and Greeks in South Russia. Oxford: Clarendon Press, 1922.
A large estate in Egypt in the third century B.C. A study in economic history. Madison: University of Wisconsin, 1922.
Skythien und der Bosporus. 1925.
The Social and Economic History of the Roman Empire. 1926. (Revised edition in German 1931, and further revised edition in Italian 1933) (Second edition, revised by P.M. Fraser, Oxford, 1957)
A History of the Ancient World: Volume I The Orient and Greece. Oxford: Clarendon Press, 1926.
A History of the Ancient World: Volume II Rome. Oxford: Clarendon Press, 1927.
Mystic Italy. New York: Henry Holt, 1927. (Brown University, the Colver lectures series)
Caravan Cities. Oxford: Clarendon Press, 1932. (First published in book form as O Blijnem Vostoke. Paris, 1931.)
Dura-Europos and Its Art. 1938.
The Social and Economic History of the Hellenistic World. Oxford: Clarendon Press, 1941. (2nd edition 1953)

Notes

References

Further reading
 Bongard-Levin, G.M. The great Russian historian M. Rostovtsev in the USA: The years of exile. Lewiston, NY: Edwin Mellen Press, 1999 (in Russian).
 Bowersock, G.W. "Rostovtzeff in Madison" in American Scholar, Spring 1986, Vol. 55 Issue 3, pp. 391–400.
 Hopkins, Clark. The discovery of Dura-Europos. New Haven: Yale University Press, 1979.
 Momigliano, Arnaldo. "M.I. Rostovtzeff" in The Cambridge Journal, 1954, 7,  Studies in historiography (The Academy Library, TB 1288). New York: Harper Torchbooks, 1966,  Studies on Modern Scholarship. Berkeley: University of California Press, 1994 (paperback), pp. 32–43.
 Reinhold, Meyer. "Historian of the Classic World: A Critique of Rostovtzeff", Studies in Classical History and Society (American Classical Studies; 45). New York: Oxford University Press, 2002, pp. 82–100.
 Shaw, Brent D. "Under Russian eyes: [Review article]", The Journal of Roman studies, Vol. 82. (1992), pp. 216–228.
 Wes, Marinus A. Michael Rostovtzeff, historian in exile: Russian roots in an American context (Historia-Einzelschriften; 65). Stuttgart: Franz Steiner Verlag, 1990.
 Reviewed by Brent D. Shaw in The Journal of Roman Studies, Vol. 82. (1992), pp. 216–228.
 Wes, Marinus A. "The Russian background of the young Rostovtzeff", Historia: Zeitschrift für Alte Geschichte, Vol. 37, No. 2. (1988), pp. 207–221.
 Wes, Marinus A. "The Correspondence between Rostovtzeff and Westermann. A Note on Gaetano De Sanctis", Historia: Zeitschrift für Alte Geschichte, Vol. 42, No. 1. (1993), pp. 125–128.

External links
 
 
Michael Ivanovich Rostovtzeff Papers (MS 1133). Manuscripts and Archives, Yale University Library.
Rostovtzeff Project.
Mansi, Gregory. M.I. Rostovtzeff: An essay on his life and major works.

Rostovtsev
Rostovtsev
Writers from Zhytomyr
Russian classical scholars
Russian archaeologists
Russian economists
Full Members of the Russian Academy of Sciences (1917–1925)
Full Members of the USSR Academy of Sciences
Economic historians
Rostovtzeff, Michael
American people of Russian descent
Rostovtsev
Presidents of the American Historical Association
Rostovtsev, Michael
American historians
White Russian emigrants to the United States
Historians of antiquity
Classical scholars of the University of Wisconsin–Madison
Classical scholars of Yale University
Yale Sterling Professors
Scythologists
Corresponding Fellows of the British Academy